Salem Lake, locally known as Salem Pond, is an  lake located in Salem, Utah.

It was originally created by placing a dam on a spring in 1851. The city of Salem was created by settlers creating a fort along this body of water.

The following fish are found in Salem Lake: rainbow trout, channel catfish, largemouth bass, bluegill, and grass carp. The average depth is seven feet.

References 

Lakes of Utah